The 116th United States Congress was a meeting of the legislative branch of the United States federal government, composed of the Senate and the House of Representatives. It convened in Washington, D.C., on January 3, 2019, and ended on January 3, 2021, during the final two years of Donald Trump's presidency. Senators elected to regular terms in 2014 finished their terms in this Congress, and House seats were apportioned based on the 2010 census.

In the November 2018 midterm elections, the Democratic Party won a new majority in the House, while the Republican Party increased its majority in the Senate. Consequently, this was the first split Congress since the 113th Congress of 2013–2015, and the first Republican Senate–Democratic House split since the 99th Congress of 1985–1987. This Congress was the youngest incoming class by mean age, compared to the previous three the incoming class of freshman representatives, and the most demographically diverse in history.

Upon joining the Libertarian Party on May 1, 2020, Justin Amash became the first member of Congress to represent a political party other than the Democrats or the Republicans since Rep. William Carney, who served as a Conservative before switching to the Republican Party in 1985. Before joining the Libertarian Party, Amash had been serving as an independent since his departure from the Republican Party on July 4, 2019. Paul Mitchell also left the Republicans in December 2020, becoming an independent. Neither incumbent ran for re-election.

Major events

 December 22, 2018 – January 25, 2019: 2018–2019 United States federal government shutdown
 February 5, 2019: 2019 State of the Union Address was delayed from January 29 due to the partial government shutdown.
 February 15, 2019: President Trump declared a National Emergency Concerning the Southern Border of the United States.
 February 27, 2019: Former Trump lawyer Michael Cohen testified before the House Oversight and Reform Committee.
 March 24, 2019: Mueller special counsel investigation: U.S. Attorney General William Barr issued a summary letter of special counsel Robert Mueller's report to congress on the investigation into Russian interference in the 2016 presidential election.
 July 24, 2019: Mueller special counsel investigation: Special counsel Robert Mueller testified before the House Judiciary and Intelligence committees.
 September 24, 2019: First impeachment of Donald Trump: House opened an Impeachment inquiry against Donald Trump after a whistleblower alleged the President abused his power in a phone call with the President of Ukraine.
 December 13, 2019: First impeachment of Donald Trump: House Judiciary Committee approved two impeachment articles.
 December 18, 2019: First impeachment of Donald Trump: House impeached President Trump.
 January 16, 2020 – February 5, 2020: First impeachment of Donald Trump: Impeachment trial of Donald Trump
 February 4, 2020: 2020 State of the Union Address
 March 11, 2020 – present: COVID-19 pandemic in the United States
 May 26, 2020 – present: Nationwide George Floyd protests
 August 18, 2020 – present: 2020 United States Postal Service crisis
 September 30, 2020 – January 20, 2021: White House COVID-19 outbreak
 October 26, 2020: The Senate confirmed Amy Coney Barrett to the United States Supreme Court.
 November 3, 2020: 2020 United States elections were held.  Joe Biden was elected the 46th President of the United States and Kamala Harris was elected the 49th Vice President of the United States, the first woman to do so.  Democrats retained control of the United States House of Representatives, while Republicans briefly retained control of the Senate until January 20, 2021, because Democrats won both regular and special Senate elections in Georgia on January 5, 2021.

Major legislation

Enacted

 January 16, 2019: Government Employee Fair Treatment Act, Pub.L. 116-1
 February 15, 2019: Consolidated Appropriations Act, 2019, 
 March 12, 2019: John D. Dingell Jr. Conservation, Management, and Recreation Act, 
 June 24, 2019: Pandemic and All-Hazards Preparedness and Advancing Innovation Act, Pub.L. 116-22
 July 1, 2019: Taxpayer First Act of 2019, 
 July 29, 2019: Never Forget the Heroes: James Zadroga, Ray Pfeifer, and Luis Alvarez Permanent Authorization of the September 11th Victim Compensation Fund Act, 
 November 27, 2019: Hong Kong Human Rights and Democracy Act, 
 December 20, 2019: National Defense Authorization Act for Fiscal Year 2020, 
 December 20, 2019: Setting Every Community Up for Retirement Enhancement (SECURE) Act as part of the Further Consolidated Appropriations Act, 2020, 
 January 29, 2020: United States–Mexico–Canada Agreement Implementation Act, 
 Coronavirus relief acts:
 March 6, 2020: Coronavirus Preparedness and Response Supplemental Appropriations Act, 2020, 
 March 18, 2020: Families First Coronavirus Response Act, 
 March 27, 2020: Coronavirus Aid, Relief, and Economic Security Act (CARES Act), 
 April 24, 2020: Paycheck Protection Program and Health Care Enhancement Act, 
 December 27, 2020: Consolidated Appropriations Act, 2021, 
 March 26, 2020: Taiwan Allies International Protection and Enhancement Initiative Act, 
 June 17, 2020: Uyghur Human Rights Policy Act, 
 July 14, 2020: Hong Kong Autonomy Act, 
 August 4, 2020: Great American Outdoors Act,  
 October 10, 2020: Savanna's Act, Pub.L. 116-165 
 January 1, 2021: William M. (Mac) Thornberry National Defense Authorization Act for Fiscal Year 2021,  (passed over veto)
 January 13, 2021: Malala Yousafzai Scholarship Act, Pub.L. 116-338

Proposed (but not enacted) 

 House Bills
 : For the People Act of 2019
H.R. 2 Moving Forward Act
H.R. 3: Elijah Cummings Lower Drug Costs Now Act of 2019
H.R. 4: John Lewis Voting Rights Act of 2019
 : Equality Act of 2019
: American Dream and Promise Act of 2019
: Paycheck Fairness Act of 2019
: Bipartisan Background Checks Act of 2019
 : DC Admission Act of 2019
 : SAFE Banking Act of 2019
 : Marijuana Opportunity Reinvestment and Expungement Act of 2019
 : HEROES Act of 2019
 : Ending Qualified Immunity Act of 2019
 : George Floyd Justice in Policing Act of 2019
 Senate Bills
 House Joint Resolutions
 : "Opposing the decision to end certain United States efforts to prevent Turkish military operations against Syrian Kurdish forces in Northeast Syria"
 : "Removing the deadline for the ratification of the equal rights amendment"
 Passed, but vetoed
 March 15, 2019: : Relating to a national emergency declared by the President on February 15, 2019. (Vetoed)
 April 16, 2019: : A joint resolution to direct the removal of United States Armed Forces from hostilities in the Republic of Yemen that have not been authorized by Congress. (Vetoed)

Major resolutions

Adopted 
 October 31, 2019: Formally commencing an impeachment inquiry against Donald Trump,  
 December 18, 2019: "Impeaching Donald John Trump, President of the United States, for high crimes and misdemeanors",

Proposed 

 : "Recognizing the duty of the Federal Government to create a Green New Deal"

Party summary
 Resignations and new members are discussed in the "Changes in membership" section below.

Senate

House of Representatives
{| width=300px align=right
|-
| 
|}

Leadership

Senate

Presiding
 President of the Senate: Mike Pence (R)
 President pro tempore: Chuck Grassley (R)

Majority (Republican) leadership 
 Senate Majority Leader: Mitch McConnell
 Senate Majority Whip: John Thune
 Chair of the Senate Republican Conference: John Barrasso
 Chair of the Senate Republican Policy Committee: Roy Blunt
 Vice Chair of the Senate Republican Conference: Joni Ernst
 Chair of the National Republican Senatorial Committee: Todd Young
 Chair of the Senate Republican Steering Committee: Mike Lee
 Senate Republican Chief Deputy Whip: Mike Crapo
 Senate Republican Deputy Whips: Roy Blunt, Shelley Moore Capito, John Cornyn, Cory Gardner, James Lankford, Martha McSally, Rob Portman, Mitt Romney, Tim Scott, Thom Tillis, and Todd Young

Minority (Democratic) leadership 
 Senate Minority Leader and Chair of the Senate Democratic Caucus: Chuck Schumer
 Senate Minority Whip: Dick Durbin
 Senate Assistant Democratic Leader: Patty Murray
 Chair of the Senate Democratic Policy and Communications Committee: Debbie Stabenow
 Vice Chairs of the Senate Democratic Caucus: Mark Warner and Elizabeth Warren
 Chair of the Senate Democratic Steering Committee: Amy Klobuchar
 Chair of Senate Democratic Outreach: Bernie Sanders
 Vice Chair of the Senate Democratic Policy and Communications Committee: Joe Manchin
 Secretary of the Senate Democratic Caucus: Tammy Baldwin
 Chair of the Democratic Senatorial Campaign Committee: Catherine Cortez Masto
 Senate Democratic Chief Deputy Whips: Cory Booker, Jeff Merkley, and Brian Schatz

House of Representatives

Presiding
 Speaker of the House: Nancy Pelosi (D)

Majority (Democratic) leadership
 House Majority Leader: Steny Hoyer
 House Majority Whip: Jim Clyburn
 Assistant Speaker of the House: Ben Ray Luján
 Chair of the House Democratic Caucus: Hakeem Jeffries
 Vice Chair of the House Democratic Caucus: Katherine Clark
 Chair of the Democratic Congressional Campaign Committee: Cheri Bustos
 Chair of the House Democratic Policy and Communications Committee: David Cicilline
 Co-Chairs of the House Democratic Policy and Communications Committee: Matt Cartwright, Debbie Dingell, and Ted Lieu
 House Democratic Junior Caucus Leadership Representative: Jamie Raskin
 House Democratic Freshman Class Leadership Representatives: Katie Hill , Veronica Escobar , and Joe Neguse
 Co-Chairs of the House Democratic Steering and Policy Committee: Rosa DeLauro, Barbara Lee, and Eric Swalwell
 House Democratic Assistant to the Majority Whip: Cedric Richmond
 House Democratic Senior Chief Deputy Whips: John Lewis  and Jan Schakowsky
 House Democratic Chief Deputy Whips: Pete Aguilar, G. K. Butterfield, Henry Cuellar, Dan Kildee, Sheila Jackson Lee, Debbie Wasserman Schultz, Terri Sewell, and Peter Welch

Minority (Republican) leadership
 House Minority Leader and Chair of the House Republican Steering Committee: Kevin McCarthy
 House Minority Whip: Steve Scalise
 Chair of the House Republican Conference: Liz Cheney
 Vice Chair of the House Republican Conference: Mark Walker
 Secretary of the House Republican Conference: Jason Smith
 Chair of the House Republican Policy Committee: Gary Palmer
 Chair of the National Republican Congressional Committee: Tom Emmer
 House Republican Chief Deputy Whip: Drew Ferguson

Demographics 
Most members of this Congress were Christian (88.2%), with approximately half being Protestant and 30.5% being Catholic. Jewish membership is 6.4%. Other religions represented included Buddhism, Islam, and Hinduism. One senator said that she was religiously unaffiliated, while the number of members refusing to specify their religious affiliation increased.

Roughly 96% of members held college degrees. All but 128 members were white and all but 131 members were men.

Senate
The Senate included 74 men and 26 women, the most women to date. In 6 states, both senators were women; 14 states were represented by 1 man and 1 woman; and 30 states were represented by 2 men. During this Congress, Johnny Isakson retired for health reasons and Kelly Loeffler was appointed, which increased the number of women from 25 after the 2018 elections to 26. There were 91 non-Hispanic white, 4 Hispanic, 2 Black, 2 Asian, and 1 multiracial (Black/Asian) senators. Additionally, 2 senators were LGBTQ+. The average age of Senators at the beginning of this congress was 62.9 years.

House of Representatives
There were 101 women in the House, the largest number in history. There were 313 non-Hispanic white, 56 Black, 44 Hispanic, 15 Asian, and 4 Native American congress members. Eight were LGBTQ+. Two Democrats — Alexandria Ocasio-Cortez and Donna Shalala — were the youngest (30) and oldest (78) freshmen women in history. Freshmen Rashida Tlaib (D-MI) and Ilhan Omar (DFL-MN) were the first two Muslim women and freshmen Sharice Davids (D-KS) and Deb Haaland (D-NM) were the first two Native American women elected as well. The average age of Members of the House at the beginning of the 116th Congress was 57.6 years.

With the election of Carolyn Maloney as the first woman to chair the House Oversight Committee, women chaired a record six House committees in a single Congress (out of 26 women to ever chair House committees in the history of Congress), including House members Maxine Waters (Financial Services), Nita Lowey (Appropriations), Zoe Lofgren (Administration), Eddie Bernice Johnson (Science, Space and Technology) and Nydia Velázquez (Small Business), as well as Kathy Castor, who chaired the Select Committee on the Climate Crisis. In addition, women chaired a record 39 House subcommittees. Lowey and Kay Granger were also the first women to serve as chair and ranking member of the same committee in the same Congress since the since-defunct Select Committee on the House Beauty Shop, which was chaired and populated entirely by congresswomen during its existence from 1967 to 1977.

Diversity of the freshman class 
The demographics of the 116th U.S. Congress freshmen were more diverse than any previous incoming class.

At least 25 new congressional representatives were Hispanic, Native American, or people of color, and the incoming class included the first Native American women, the first Muslim women, and the two youngest women ever elected. The 116th Congress included more women elected to the House than any previous Congress.

Members

Senate

The numbers refer to their Senate classes. All class 1 seats were contested in the November 2018 elections. In this Congress, class 1 means their term commenced in the current Congress, requiring re-election in 2024; class 2 means their term ends with this Congress, requiring re-election in 2020; and class 3 means their term began in the last Congress, requiring re-election in 2022.

Alabama 
 2. Doug Jones (D)
 3. Richard Shelby (R)

Alaska 
 2. Dan Sullivan (R)
 3. Lisa Murkowski (R)

Arizona 
 1. Kyrsten Sinema (D)
 3. Martha McSally (R) (until December 2, 2020)
 Mark Kelly (D) (from December 2, 2020)

Arkansas 
 2. Tom Cotton (R)
 3. John Boozman (R)

California 
 1. Dianne Feinstein (D)
 3. Kamala Harris (D)

Colorado 
 2. Cory Gardner (R)
 3. Michael Bennet (D)

Connecticut 
 1. Chris Murphy (D)
 3. Richard Blumenthal (D)

Delaware 
 1. Tom Carper (D)
 2. Chris Coons (D)

Florida 
 1. Rick Scott (R) (from January 8, 2019)
 3. Marco Rubio (R)

Georgia 
 2. David Perdue (R)
 3. Johnny Isakson (R) (until December 31, 2019)
 Kelly Loeffler (R) (from January 6, 2020)

Hawaii 
 1. Mazie Hirono (D)
 3. Brian Schatz (D)

Idaho 
 2. Jim Risch (R)
 3. Mike Crapo (R)

Illinois 
 2. Dick Durbin (D)
 3. Tammy Duckworth (D)

Indiana 
 1. Mike Braun (R)
 3. Todd Young (R)

Iowa 
 2. Joni Ernst (R)
 3. Chuck Grassley (R)

Kansas 
 2. Pat Roberts (R)
 3. Jerry Moran (R)

Kentucky 
 2. Mitch McConnell (R)
 3. Rand Paul (R)

Louisiana 
 2. Bill Cassidy (R)
 3. John Kennedy (R)

Maine 
 1. Angus King (I)
 2. Susan Collins (R)

Maryland 
 1. Ben Cardin (D)
 3. Chris Van Hollen (D)

Massachusetts 
 1. Elizabeth Warren (D)
 2. Ed Markey (D)

Michigan 
 1. Debbie Stabenow (D)
 2. Gary Peters (D)

Minnesota 
 1. Amy Klobuchar (DFL)
 2. Tina Smith (DFL)

Mississippi 
 1. Roger Wicker (R)
 2. Cindy Hyde-Smith (R)

Missouri 
 1. Josh Hawley (R)
 3. Roy Blunt (R)

Montana 
 1. Jon Tester (D)
 2. Steve Daines (R)

Nebraska 
 1. Deb Fischer (R)
 2. Ben Sasse (R)

Nevada 
 1. Jacky Rosen (D)
 3. Catherine Cortez Masto (D)

New Hampshire 
 2. Jeanne Shaheen (D)
 3. Maggie Hassan (D)

New Jersey 
 1. Bob Menendez (D)
 2. Cory Booker (D)

New Mexico 
 1. Martin Heinrich (D)
 2. Tom Udall (D)

New York 
 1. Kirsten Gillibrand (D)
 3. Chuck Schumer (D)

North Carolina 
 2. Thom Tillis (R)
 3. Richard Burr (R)

North Dakota 
 1. Kevin Cramer (R)
 3. John Hoeven (R)

Ohio 
 1. Sherrod Brown (D)
 3. Rob Portman (R)

Oklahoma 
 2. Jim Inhofe (R)
 3. James Lankford (R)

Oregon 
 2. Jeff Merkley (D)
 3. Ron Wyden (D)

Pennsylvania 
 1. Bob Casey Jr. (D)
 3. Pat Toomey (R)

Rhode Island 
 1. Sheldon Whitehouse (D)
 2. Jack Reed (D)

South Carolina 
 2. Lindsey Graham (R)
 3. Tim Scott (R)

South Dakota 
 2. Mike Rounds (R)
 3. John Thune (R)

Tennessee 
 1. Marsha Blackburn (R)
 2. Lamar Alexander (R)

Texas 
 1. Ted Cruz (R)
 2. John Cornyn (R)

Utah 
 1. Mitt Romney (R)
 3. Mike Lee (R)

Vermont 
 1. Bernie Sanders (I)
 3. Patrick Leahy (D)

Virginia 
 1. Tim Kaine (D)
 2. Mark Warner (D)

Washington 
 1. Maria Cantwell (D)
 3. Patty Murray (D)

West Virginia 
 1. Joe Manchin (D)
 2. Shelley Moore Capito (R)

Wisconsin 
 1. Tammy Baldwin (D)
 3. Ron Johnson (R)

Wyoming 
 1. John Barrasso (R)
 2. Mike Enzi (R)

House of Representatives

Alabama
 . Bradley Byrne (R)
 . Martha Roby (R)
 . Mike Rogers (R)
 . Robert Aderholt (R)
 . Mo Brooks (R)
 . Gary Palmer (R)
 . Terri Sewell (D)

Alaska
 . Don Young (R)

Arizona
 . Tom O'Halleran (D)
 . Ann Kirkpatrick (D)
 . Raúl Grijalva (D)
 . Paul Gosar (R)
 . Andy Biggs (R)
 . David Schweikert (R)
 . Ruben Gallego (D)
 . Debbie Lesko (R)
 . Greg Stanton (D)

Arkansas
 . Rick Crawford (R)
 . French Hill (R)
 . Steve Womack (R)
 . Bruce Westerman (R)

California
 . Doug LaMalfa (R)
 . Jared Huffman (D)
 . John Garamendi (D)
 . Tom McClintock (R)
 . Mike Thompson (D)
 . Doris Matsui (D)
 . Ami Bera (D)
 . Paul Cook (R) 
 . Jerry McNerney (D)
 . Josh Harder (D)
 . Mark DeSaulnier (D)
 . Nancy Pelosi (D)
 . Barbara Lee (D)
 . Jackie Speier (D)
 . Eric Swalwell (D)
 . Jim Costa (D)
 . Ro Khanna (D)
 . Anna Eshoo (D)
 . Zoe Lofgren (D)
 . Jimmy Panetta (D)
 . TJ Cox (D)
 . Devin Nunes (R)
 . Kevin McCarthy (R)
 . Salud Carbajal (D)
 . Katie Hill (D) 
 Mike Garcia (R) 
 . Julia Brownley (D)
 . Judy Chu (D)
 . Adam Schiff (D)
 . Tony Cárdenas (D)
 . Brad Sherman (D)
 . Pete Aguilar (D)
 . Grace Napolitano (D)
 . Ted Lieu (D)
 . Jimmy Gomez (D)
 . Norma Torres (D)
 . Raul Ruiz (D)
 . Karen Bass (D)
 . Linda Sánchez (D)
 . Gil Cisneros (D)
 . Lucille Roybal-Allard (D)
 . Mark Takano (D)
 . Ken Calvert (R)
 . Maxine Waters (D)
 . Nanette Barragán (D)
 . Katie Porter (D)
 . Lou Correa (D)
 . Alan Lowenthal (D)
 . Harley Rouda (D)
 . Mike Levin (D)
 . Duncan D. Hunter (R) 
 . Juan Vargas (D)
 . Scott Peters (D)
 . Susan Davis (D)

Colorado
 . Diana DeGette (D)
 . Joe Neguse (D)
 . Scott Tipton (R)
 . Ken Buck (R)
 . Doug Lamborn (R)
 . Jason Crow (D)
 . Ed Perlmutter (D)

Connecticut
 . John B. Larson (D)
 . Joe Courtney (D)
 . Rosa DeLauro (D)
 . Jim Himes (D)
 . Jahana Hayes (D)

Delaware
 . Lisa Blunt Rochester (D)

Florida
 . Matt Gaetz (R)
 . Neal Dunn (R)
 . Ted Yoho (R)
 . John Rutherford (R)
 . Al Lawson (D)
 . Michael Waltz (R)
 . Stephanie Murphy (D)
 . Bill Posey (R)
 . Darren Soto (D)
 . Val Demings (D)
 . Daniel Webster (R)
 . Gus Bilirakis (R)
 . Charlie Crist (D)
 . Kathy Castor (D)
 . Ross Spano (R)
 . Vern Buchanan (R)
 . Greg Steube (R)
 . Brian Mast (R)
 . Francis Rooney (R)
 . Alcee Hastings (D)
 . Lois Frankel (D)
 . Ted Deutch (D)
 . Debbie Wasserman Schultz (D)
 . Frederica Wilson (D)
 . Mario Díaz-Balart (R)
 . Debbie Mucarsel-Powell (D)
 . Donna Shalala (D)

Georgia
 . Buddy Carter (R)
 . Sanford Bishop (D)
 . Drew Ferguson (R)
 . Hank Johnson (D)
 . John Lewis (D) 
 Kwanza Hall (D) 
 . Lucy McBath (D)
 . Rob Woodall (R)
 . Austin Scott (R)
 . Doug Collins (R)
 . Jody Hice (R)
 . Barry Loudermilk (R)
 . Rick W. Allen (R)
 . David Scott (D)
 . Tom Graves (R)

Hawaii
 . Ed Case (D)
 . Tulsi Gabbard (D)

Idaho
 . Russ Fulcher (R)
 . Mike Simpson (R)

Illinois
 . Bobby Rush (D)
 . Robin Kelly (D)
 . Dan Lipinski (D)
 . Jesús "Chuy" García (D)
 . Mike Quigley (D)
 . Sean Casten (D)
 . Danny K. Davis (D)
 . Raja Krishnamoorthi (D)
 . Jan Schakowsky (D)
 . Brad Schneider (D)
 . Bill Foster (D)
 . Mike Bost (R)
 . Rodney Davis (R)
 . Lauren Underwood (D)
 . John Shimkus (R)
 . Adam Kinzinger (R)
 . Cheri Bustos (D)
 . Darin LaHood (R)

Indiana
 . Pete Visclosky (D)
 . Jackie Walorski (R)
 . Jim Banks (R)
 . Jim Baird (R)
 . Susan Brooks (R)
 . Greg Pence (R)
 . André Carson (D)
 . Larry Bucshon (R)
 . Trey Hollingsworth (R)

Iowa
 . Abby Finkenauer (D)
 . Dave Loebsack (D)
 . Cindy Axne (D)
 . Steve King (R)

Kansas
 . Roger Marshall (R)
 . Steve Watkins (R)
 . Sharice Davids (D)
 . Ron Estes (R)

Kentucky
 . James Comer (R)
 . Brett Guthrie (R)
 . John Yarmuth (D)
 . Thomas Massie (R)
 . Hal Rogers (R)
 . Andy Barr (R)

Louisiana
 . Steve Scalise (R)
 . Cedric Richmond (D)
 . Clay Higgins (R)
 . Mike Johnson (R)
 . Ralph Abraham (R)
 . Garret Graves (R)

Maine
 . Chellie Pingree (D)
 . Jared Golden (D)

Maryland
 . Andy Harris (R)
 . Dutch Ruppersberger (D)
 . John Sarbanes (D)
 . Anthony Brown (D)
 . Steny Hoyer (D)
 . David Trone (D)
 . Elijah Cummings (D) 
 Kweisi Mfume (D) 
 . Jamie Raskin (D)

Massachusetts
 . Richard Neal (D)
 . Jim McGovern (D)
 . Lori Trahan (D)
 . Joe Kennedy III (D)
 . Katherine Clark (D)
 . Seth Moulton (D)
 . Ayanna Pressley (D)
 . Stephen F. Lynch (D)
 . Bill Keating (D)

Michigan
 . Jack Bergman (R)
 . Bill Huizenga (R)
 . Justin Amash (R, then I, then L)
 . John Moolenaar (R)
 . Dan Kildee (D)
 . Fred Upton (R)
 . Tim Walberg (R)
 . Elissa Slotkin (D)
 . Andy Levin (D)
 . Paul Mitchell (R, then I)
 . Haley Stevens (D)
 . Debbie Dingell (D)
 . Rashida Tlaib (D)
 . Brenda Lawrence (D)

Minnesota
 . Jim Hagedorn (R)
 . Angie Craig (DFL)
 . Dean Phillips (DFL)
 . Betty McCollum (DFL)
 . Ilhan Omar (DFL)
 . Tom Emmer (R)
 . Collin Peterson (DFL)
 . Pete Stauber (R)

Mississippi
 . Trent Kelly (R)
 . Bennie Thompson (D)
 . Michael Guest (R)
 . Steven Palazzo (R)

Missouri
 . Lacy Clay (D)
 . Ann Wagner (R)
 . Blaine Luetkemeyer (R)
 . Vicky Hartzler (R)
 . Emanuel Cleaver (D)
 . Sam Graves (R)
 . Billy Long (R)
 . Jason Smith (R)

Montana
 . Greg Gianforte (R)

Nebraska
 . Jeff Fortenberry (R)
 . Don Bacon (R)
 . Adrian Smith (R)

Nevada
 . Dina Titus (D)
 . Mark Amodei (R)
 . Susie Lee (D)
 . Steven Horsford (D)

New Hampshire
 . Chris Pappas (D)
 . Annie Kuster (D)

New Jersey
 . Donald Norcross (D)
 . Jeff Van Drew (D, then R)
 . Andy Kim (D)
 . Chris Smith (R)
 . Josh Gottheimer (D)
 . Frank Pallone (D)
 . Tom Malinowski (D)
 . Albio Sires (D)
 . Bill Pascrell (D)
 . Donald Payne Jr. (D)
 . Mikie Sherrill (D)
 . Bonnie Watson Coleman (D)

New Mexico
 . Deb Haaland (D)
 . Xochitl Torres Small (D)
 . Ben Ray Luján (D)

New York
 . Lee Zeldin (R)
 . Peter T. King (R)
 . Thomas Suozzi (D)
 . Kathleen Rice (D)
 . Gregory Meeks (D)
 . Grace Meng (D)
 . Nydia Velázquez (D)
 . Hakeem Jeffries (D)
 . Yvette Clarke (D)
 . Jerry Nadler (D)
 . Max Rose (D)
 . Carolyn Maloney (D)
 . Adriano Espaillat (D)
 . Alexandria Ocasio-Cortez (D)
 . José E. Serrano (D)
 . Eliot Engel (D)
 . Nita Lowey (D)
 . Sean Patrick Maloney (D)
 . Antonio Delgado (D)
 . Paul Tonko (D)
 . Elise Stefanik (R)
 . Anthony Brindisi (D)
 . Tom Reed (R)
 . John Katko (R)
 . Joseph Morelle (D)
 . Brian Higgins (D)
 . Chris Collins (R) 
 Chris Jacobs (R)

North Carolina
 . G. K. Butterfield (D)
 . George Holding (R)
 . Walter B. Jones Jr. (R) 
 Greg Murphy (R) 
 . David Price (D)
 . Virginia Foxx (R)
 . Mark Walker (R)
 . David Rouzer (R)
 . Richard Hudson (R)
 . Dan Bishop (R) 
 . Patrick McHenry (R)
 . Mark Meadows (R) 
 . Alma Adams (D)
 . Ted Budd (R)

North Dakota
 . Kelly Armstrong (R)

Ohio
 . Steve Chabot (R)
 . Brad Wenstrup (R)
 . Joyce Beatty (D)
 . Jim Jordan (R)
 . Bob Latta (R)
 . Bill Johnson (R)
 . Bob Gibbs (R)
 . Warren Davidson (R)
 . Marcy Kaptur (D)
 . Mike Turner (R)
 . Marcia Fudge (D)
 . Troy Balderson (R)
 . Tim Ryan (D)
 . David Joyce (R)
 . Steve Stivers (R)
 . Anthony Gonzalez (R)

Oklahoma
 . Kevin Hern (R)
 . Markwayne Mullin (R)
 . Frank Lucas (R)
 . Tom Cole (R)
 . Kendra Horn (D)

Oregon
 . Suzanne Bonamici (D)
 . Greg Walden (R)
 . Earl Blumenauer (D)
 . Peter DeFazio (D)
 . Kurt Schrader (D)

Pennsylvania
 . Brian Fitzpatrick (R)
 . Brendan Boyle (D)
 . Dwight Evans (D)
 . Madeleine Dean (D)
 . Mary Gay Scanlon (D)
 . Chrissy Houlahan (D)
 . Susan Wild (D)
 . Matt Cartwright (D)
 . Dan Meuser (R)
 . Scott Perry (R)
 . Lloyd Smucker (R)
 . Tom Marino (R) 
 Fred Keller (R) 
 . John Joyce (R)
 . Guy Reschenthaler (R)
 . Glenn Thompson (R)
 . Mike Kelly (R)
 . Conor Lamb (D)
 . Mike Doyle (D)

Rhode Island
 . David Cicilline (D)
 . James Langevin (D)

South Carolina
 . Joe Cunningham (D)
 . Joe Wilson (R)
 . Jeff Duncan (R)
 . William Timmons (R)
 . Ralph Norman (R)
 . Jim Clyburn (D)
 . Tom Rice (R)

South Dakota
 . Dusty Johnson (R)

Tennessee
 . Phil Roe (R)
 . Tim Burchett (R)
 . Chuck Fleischmann (R)
 . Scott DesJarlais (R)
 . Jim Cooper (D)
 . John Rose (R)
 . Mark E. Green (R)
 . David Kustoff (R)
 . Steve Cohen (D)

Texas
 . Louie Gohmert (R)
 . Dan Crenshaw (R)
 . Van Taylor (R)
 . John Ratcliffe (R) 
 . Lance Gooden (R)
 . Ron Wright (R)
 . Lizzie Fletcher (D)
 . Kevin Brady (R)
 . Al Green (D)
 . Michael McCaul (R)
 . Mike Conaway (R)
 . Kay Granger (R)
 . Mac Thornberry (R)
 . Randy Weber (R)
 . Vicente Gonzalez (D)
 . Veronica Escobar (D)
 . Bill Flores (R)
 . Sheila Jackson Lee (D)
 . Jodey Arrington (R)
 . Joaquin Castro (D)
 . Chip Roy (R)
 . Pete Olson (R)
 . Will Hurd (R)
 . Kenny Marchant (R)
 . Roger Williams (R)
 . Michael C. Burgess (R)
 . Michael Cloud (R)
 . Henry Cuellar (D)
 . Sylvia Garcia (D)
 . Eddie Bernice Johnson (D)
 . John Carter (R)
 . Colin Allred (D)
 . Marc Veasey (D)
 . Filemon Vela Jr. (D)
 . Lloyd Doggett (D)
 . Brian Babin (R)

Utah
 . Rob Bishop (R)
 . Chris Stewart (R)
 . John Curtis (R)
 . Ben McAdams (D)

Vermont
 . Peter Welch (D)

Virginia
 . Rob Wittman (R)
 . Elaine Luria (D)
 . Bobby Scott (D)
 . Donald McEachin (D)
 . Denver Riggleman (R)
 . Ben Cline (R)
 . Abigail Spanberger (D)
 . Don Beyer (D)
 . Morgan Griffith (R)
 . Jennifer Wexton (D)
 . Gerry Connolly (D)

Washington
 . Suzan DelBene (D)
 . Rick Larsen (D)
 . Jaime Herrera Beutler (R)
 . Dan Newhouse (R)
 . Cathy McMorris Rodgers (R)
 . Derek Kilmer (D)
 . Pramila Jayapal (D)
 . Kim Schrier (D)
 . Adam Smith (D)
 . Denny Heck (D)

West Virginia
 . David McKinley (R)
 . Alex Mooney (R)
 . Carol Miller (R)

Wisconsin
 . Bryan Steil (R)
 . Mark Pocan (D)
 . Ron Kind (D)
 . Gwen Moore (D)
 . Jim Sensenbrenner (R)
 . Glenn Grothman (R)
 . Sean Duffy (R) 
 Tom Tiffany (R) 
 . Mike Gallagher (R)

Wyoming
 . Liz Cheney (R)

Non-voting members
 . Amata Coleman Radewagen (R)
 . Eleanor Holmes Norton (D)
 . Michael San Nicolas (D)
 . Gregorio Sablan (I)
 . Jenniffer González (R/PNP)
 . Stacey Plaskett (D)

Caucuses

Changes in membership

Senate

|-
| Florida(1)
| data-sort-value="Vacant" | Vacant
| data-sort-value="January 8, 2019" | Senator-elect chose to wait until finishing term as Governor of Florida.
| data-sort-value="Scott Rick"  | Rick Scott(R)
| January 8, 2019

|-
| Georgia(3)
| data-sort-value="Isakson Johnny"  | Johnny Isakson(R)
| data-sort-value="December 31, 2019" | Incumbent resigned December 31, 2019.Successor was appointed the same day to continue the term.
| data-sort-value="Loeffler Kelly"  | Kelly Loeffler(R)
|  January 6, 2020

|-
| Arizona(3)
| data-sort-value="McSally Martha"  | Martha McSally(R)
| data-sort-value="December 31, 2019" | Appointee lost special election to finish the term.Successor elected November 3, 2020.
| data-sort-value="Kelly Mark"  | Mark Kelly(D)
| December 2, 2020

|}

House of Representatives

|-
| 
| data-sort-value="AAAVacant" nowrap | Vacant
| data-sort-value="January 3, 2019" | Vacant from the start of the term as allegations of fraud in the 2018 general election prevented the results from being certified.A special election was held September 10, 2019.
| data-sort-value="Bishop Dan"  | Dan Bishop(R)
| September 17, 2019

|-
| 
| data-sort-value="Marino Tom" nowrap  | Tom Marino(R)
| data-sort-value="January 23, 2019" | Resigned January 23, 2019, to take job in private sector.A special election was held May 21, 2019.
| data-sort-value="Keller Fred"  | Fred Keller(R)
| June 3, 2019

|-
| 
| data-sort-value="Jones Walter B. Jr." nowrap  | Walter B. Jones Jr. (R)
| data-sort-value="February 10, 2019" | Died February 10, 2019.A special election was held September 10, 2019.
| data-sort-value="Murphy Greg"  | Greg Murphy(R)
| September 17, 2019

|-
| 
| data-sort-value="Amash Justin" nowrap  | Justin Amash (R)
| data-sort-value="July 4, 2019" | Changed party July 4, 2019.
| data-sort-value="Amash Justin"  | Justin Amash (I)
| July 4, 2019

|-
| 
| data-sort-value="Duffy Sean" nowrap  | Sean Duffy (R)
| data-sort-value="September 23, 2019" | Resigned September 23, 2019.A special election was held May 12, 2020.
| data-sort-value="Tiffany Tom"  | Tom Tiffany(R)
| May 19, 2020

|-
| 
| data-sort-value="Collins Chris" nowrap  | Chris Collins (R)
| data-sort-value="October 1, 2019" | Resigned October 1, 2019.A special election was held June 23, 2020.
| data-sort-value="Jacobs Chris"  | Chris Jacobs(R)
| colspan=1 | July 21, 2020

|-
| 
| data-sort-value="Cummings Elijah" nowrap  | Elijah Cummings (D)
| data-sort-value="October 17, 2019" | Died October 17, 2019.A special election was held April 28, 2020.
| data-sort-value="Mfume Kweisi"  | Kweisi Mfume(D)
| May 5, 2020

|-
| 
| data-sort-value="Hill Katie" nowrap  | Katie Hill (D)
| data-sort-value="November 1, 2019" | Resigned November 3, 2019, due to allegations of improper relationships with staffer.A special election was held March 3, 2020, and a runoff election was held May 12, 2020.
| data-sort-value="Garcia Mike"  | Mike Garcia(R)
| May 19, 2020

|-
| 
| data-sort-value="Van Drew Jeff" nowrap  | Jeff Van Drew (D)
| data-sort-value="December 19, 2019" | Changed party December 19, 2019.
| data-sort-value="Van Drew Jeff"  | Jeff Van Drew (R)
| December 19, 2019

|-
| 
| data-sort-value="Hunter Duncan" nowrap  | Duncan D. Hunter (R)
| data-sort-value="January 13, 2020" | Resigned January 13, 2020, following felony indictment.
| colspan=2 | Vacant until the next Congress

|-
| 
| data-sort-value="Meadows Mark" nowrap  | Mark Meadows (R)
| data-sort-value="March 30, 2020" | Resigned March 30, 2020, to become White House Chief of Staff. 
| colspan=2 | Vacant until the next Congress

|-
| 
| data-sort-value="Amash Justin" nowrap  | Justin Amash (I)
| data-sort-value="May 1, 2020" | Changed party May 1, 2020.
| data-sort-value="Amash Justin"  | Justin Amash (L)
| May 1, 2020

|-
| 
| data-sort-value="Ratcliffe John" nowrap  | John Ratcliffe(R)
| data-sort-value="May 22, 2020" | Resigned May 22, 2020, to become Director of National Intelligence.
| colspan=2 | Vacant until the next Congress

|-
| 
| data-sort-value="Lewis John" nowrap  | John Lewis(D)
| data-sort-value="July 17, 2020" | Died July 17, 2020.A special election runoff was held December 1, 2020.
| data-sort-value="Kwanza Hall"  | Kwanza Hall(D)
| December 3, 2020

|-
| 
| data-sort-value="Graves Tom" nowrap  | Tom Graves(R)
| data-sort-value="October 4, 2020" | Resigned October 4, 2020.
| colspan=2 | Vacant until the next Congress

|-
| 
| data-sort-value="Cook Paul" nowrap  | Paul Cook(R)
| data-sort-value="March 3, 2020" | Resigned December 7, 2020, after being elected a member of the San Bernardino County Supervisors.
| colspan=2 | Vacant until the next Congress

|-
| 
| data-sort-value="Mitchell Paul" nowrap  | Paul Mitchell(R)
| data-sort-value="December 14, 2020" | Changed party December 14, 2020.
| data-sort-value="Mitchell Paul"  | Paul Mitchell (I)
| December 14, 2020
|}

Committees 
Section contents: Senate, House, Joint

Senate

House of Representatives

Joint

Employees and legislative agency directors 
Also called "elected" or "appointed" officials, there are many employees of the House and Senate whose leaders are included here.

Senate
 Chaplain: Barry C. Black (Seventh-day Adventist)
 Historian: Betty Koed 
 Parliamentarian: Elizabeth MacDonough
 Secretary: Julie E. Adams
 Sergeant at Arms: Michael C. Stenger
 Secretary for the Majority: 
 until February 2020: Laura Dove
 starting February 2020: Robert Duncan
 Secretary for the Minority: Gary B. Myrick

House of Representatives 
 Chaplain: Patrick J. Conroy (Roman Catholic)
 Chief Administrative Officer: Phil Kiko
 Clerk:
 until February 26, 2019: Karen L. Haas
 starting February 26, 2019: Cheryl L. Johnson
 Historian: Matthew Wasniewski
 Inspector General: Michael Ptasienski
 Parliamentarian: 
 until September 30, 2020: Thomas J. Wickham Jr.
 starting September 30, 2020: Jason A. Smith
 Reading Clerks: Susan Cole and Joseph Novotny
 Sergeant at Arms: Paul D. Irving

Legislative branch agency directors
 Architect of the Capitol: 
 until August 17, 2019: Christine A. Merdon (acting)
 August 17, 2019 – January 16, 2020: Thomas J. Carroll III (acting)
 starting January 16, 2020: Brett Blanton
 Attending Physician of the United States Congress: Brian P. Monahan
 Comptroller General of the United States: Gene Dodaro
 Director of the Congressional Budget Office: 
 until May 31, 2019: Keith Hall
 starting June 3, 2019: Phillip Swagel
 Librarian of Congress: Carla Diane Hayden
 Director of the U.S. Government Publishing Office: Vacant
 Counselor of the Office of the Law Revision Counsel: Ralph V. Seep
 Counselor of the Office of House Legislative Counsel: Ernest Wade Ballou Jr.
 Public Printer of the United States: Hugh N. Halpern

See also

Elections
 2018 United States elections (elections leading to this Congress)
 2018 United States Senate elections
 2018 United States House of Representatives elections
 2019 United States elections (elections during this Congress)
 2019 United States House of Representatives elections
 2020 United States elections (elections during this Congress, leading to the next Congress)
 2020 United States presidential election
 2020 United States Senate elections
 2020 United States House of Representatives elections

Membership lists
 List of new members of the 116th United States Congress

Notes

References

External links

, via Congress.gov
Videos of House of Representatives Sessions for the 116th Congress from C-SPAN
Videos of Senate Sessions for the 116th Congress from C-SPAN
Videos of Committees from the House and Senate for the 116th Congress C-SPAN
Congressional Pictorial Directory for the 116th Congress
Official Congressional Directory for the 116th Congress